Rebecca Beardmore is a Canadian contemporary printmaker, photographer and installation artist. Her work can be found in many museums and galleries in North America, Europe, Asia, and Australia. Born in Montreal, Canada, she currently works in Sydney, Australia.

Exhibitions and important collections

Solo exhibitions 
On Reflection, Artereal Gallery, Sydney (2010)
Seeing Words, Reading Pictures, Artereal Gallery, Sydney (2009)
Seeing Between, Artereal Gallery, Sydney (2008)
Shifting Point, First Draft Gallery, Sydney (2003)
Whisper, Fine Arts Building Gallery, Edmonton (2001)

Collections 
Guangdong Museum of Art, China
Art Gallery of New South Wales, Australia
Rhodes Island School of Art and Design, Museums and Collections
Print Study Centre, University of Alberta, Canada
University of Texas, Museums and Collection, USA
Western Sydney University, Sydney

Awards 
Fremantle Arts Centre Print Award (winner) (2010)
Josephine Ulrick & Win Schubert Photography Award (finalist) (2010)
Southern Graphics Council, invited speaker, Kansas City (2007)
Evolution Art Prize (2002)
Musashino Art University, Tokyo, Japan, Artist in residence, April–July (2001)
Alberta Foundation for the Arts, Grant (1999)
KPMG achievement award (1999)
Australian Printmedia Awards (1997)

Sources 
http://www.artereal.com.au/home/rebecca-beardmore
http://sydney.edu.au/sca/profiles/Rebecca_Beardmore.shtml

Year of birth missing (living people)
Living people